Anthidium pulchellum is a species of bee in the family Megachilidae, the leaf-cutter, carder, or mason bees.

Synonyms
Synonyms for this species include:
Anthidium nitidicolle Friese, 1897
Anthidium asniense Cockerell, 1931

References

pulchellum
Insects described in 1832
Taxa named by Johann Christoph Friedrich Klug